Dave Barry's History of the Millennium (So Far) is a book written by humorist author Dave Barry and published in 2007 by G. P. Putnam's Sons.  The book is a collection of Barry's "Year in Review" articles for the years 2000 through 2006, as well as an introductory chapter that covers the events of the previous millennium.

2007 non-fiction books
Comedy books
G. P. Putnam's Sons books
Works by Dave Barry
Works originally published in American newspapers